Lindsey Moore (born June 3, 1991) is an American professional basketball player, who formerly played for the Minnesota Lynx of the WNBA, Virtus Elite La Spezia of LegA Basket Femminile and the Australian Women's National Basketball League (WNBL) for the West Coast Waves.

Moore is a point guard, and played college basketball at the University of Nebraska, where she was an AP All-American.

Moore was drafted in the first round by the Lynx, and made the team out of training camp. She is currently a backup guard on the team. She made her professional debut on June 1, 2013, in a victory over the Connecticut Sun. Her playing time in the early season was limited, as she played behind all-WNBA point guard Lindsay Whalen; however, as the season progressed, Moore's playing time increased, and by the playoffs, she was often the second guard off the bench for a team that won the WNBA championship.

Moore was cut from the Lynx on June 24, 2014. She was raised in Covington, Washington.

WNBA career statistics

Regular season

|-
|style="text-align:left;background:#afe6ba;"|  2013†
| align="left" | Minnesota
| 23 || 0 || 5.7 || .258 || .250 || .750 || 0.6 || 1.0 || 0.1 || 0.0 || 0.5 || 1.0
|-
| align="left" | 2014
| align="left" | Minnesota
| 12 || 0 || 8.5 || .200 || .333 || .667 || 0.8 || 1.2 || 0.3 || 0.0 || 0.3 || 1.1
|-
| align="left" | Career
| align="left" | 2 years, 1 team
| 35 || 0 || 6.6 || .239 || .286 || .700 || 0.6 || 1.1 || 0.2 || 0.0 || 0.4 || 1.0

Playoffs

|-
|style="text-align:left;background:#afe6ba;"|  2013†
| align="left" | Minnesota
| 6 || 0 || 6.2 || .167 || .000 || .000 || 0.3 || 1.2 || 0.3 || 0.2 || 0.7 || 0.3
|-
| align="left" | Career
| align="left" | 1 year, 1 team
| 6 || 0 || 6.2 || .167 || .000 || .000 || 0.3 || 1.2 || 0.3 || 0.2 || 0.7 || 0.3

Nebraska  statistics

Source

References

1991 births
Living people
American expatriate basketball people in Australia
American expatriate basketball people in Italy
American women's basketball players
Basketball players from Tacoma, Washington
Kentwood High School (Washington) alumni
Minnesota Lynx draft picks
Minnesota Lynx players
Nebraska Cornhuskers women's basketball players
Parade High School All-Americans (girls' basketball)
People from Covington, Washington
Point guards
Sportspeople from King County, Washington